Red Back Fever is the tenth studio album by hard rock band The Angels and reached No. 14 on the ARIA Albums Chart and No. 41 in New Zealand.

Track listing
 "Tear Me Apart" (Bob Spencer, Richard Brewster, Brent Eccles) – 5:15
 "Some of That Love" (Spencer, R. Brewster, Eccles) – 3:51 
 "Once Bitten Twice Shy" (Ian Hunter) – 4:38 (Ian Hunter cover)
 "Child in You" (Amanda Brewster, R. Brewster) – 3:28
 "Lyin' Awake in Bed" (Spencer, R. Brewster, Eccles) – 5:42 
 "Bedroom After Bedroom" (A. Brewster, Eccles, R. Brewster) – 3:58 
 "Red Back Fever" (Spencer, Eccles, Doc Neeson, James Morley, R. Brewster) – 3:59	
 "Don't Need You" (Spencer, Eccles, Morley, R.Brewster) – 2:20
 "Natural Born Woman" (Steve Marriott) – 3:40 (Humble Pie cover)
 "High and Dry" (Spencer, Eccles)  – 5:53 
 "Hold On" (Spencer, R. Brewster, Eccles) – 6:12
 "No More Words" (Spencer, R. Brewster, Eccles) – 1:42

Personnel 
The Angels
Doc Neeson – lead vocals
Rick Brewster – lead guitar, rhythm guitar, piano, organ, backing vocals
Bob Spencer – lead guitar, rhythm guitar, backing vocals
James Morley – bass guitar, backing vocals
Brent Eccles – drums

Additional musicians
Steve James – bass and percussion on track 3, backing vocals on tracks 2 and 3
Chris Harris – harmonica on track 2

Production
Steve James – producer, engineer, mixing at Gotham Audio, Melbourne, Australia
James Cadsky – engineer
David Hemming – mixing
Nigel Derricks – mixing assistant
Don Bartley – mastering at EMI Studios 301, Sydney, Australia

Charts

Certifications

References

1991 albums
The Angels (Australian band) albums
Mushroom Records albums